MkLinux (for Microkernel Linux) is an open-source software computer operating system begun by the Open Software Foundation Research Institute and Apple Computer in February 1996, to port Linux to the PowerPC platform, and Macintosh computers. The name refers to the Linux kernel being adapted to run as a server hosted on the Mach microkernel, version 3.0.

History

MkLinux started as a project sponsored by Apple Computer and OSF Research Institute, to get "Linux on Mach" ported to the Macintosh computer and for Apple to explore alternative kernel technologies on the Mac platform. At the time, there was no officially sponsored PowerPC port of Linux, and none specifically for Macintosh hardware. The OSF Institute, owner of the Mach microkernel and several other Unix-based technologies, was interested in promoting Mach on other platforms. Unlike the design of the later macOS versions 10 and newer (not to be confused with the contemporaneous Mac OS versions 9 and older), MkLinux was designed to take full advantage of the Mach microkernel. By contrast, macOS inherited from NeXTSTEP the hybrid kernel named XNU, wherein the BSD kernel personality is grafted on Mach, which are both run together in a single kernel address space for faster performance.

The effort was spearheaded by Apple's VP of Development Tools Ike Nassi and Brett Halle at Apple, and development was later split between two main people: Michael Burg on device drivers and distribution at Apple in Cupertino, California; and Nick Stephen on Mach porting and development at the OSF in Grenoble, France. Other key individuals to work on the project included François Barbou at OSF, and Vicki Brown and Gilbert Coville at Apple.

MkLinux was officially announced at the 1996 World Wide Developers Conference (WWDC). A free CD containing a binary distribution of MkLinux was handed out to the attendees.

In mid 1998, the community-led MkLinux Developers Association took over development of the operating system.

The MkLinux distribution is much too large for casual users to have downloaded via the slow dial-up Internet access of the day, even using 56k modems. However, the official CDs were available in a book from Prime Time Freeware, published in English and in Japanese. The book covers installation, management, and use of the OS, and serves as a hardcopy manual.

Apple later released the Open Firmware-based Power Macintosh computers, an official PowerPC branch of the Linux kernel was created and was spearheaded by the LinuxPPC project. MkLinux and LinuxPPC developers traded a lot of ideas back and forth as both worked on their own ways of running Linux. Debian also released a traditional monolithic kernel distribution for PowerPC—as did SUSE, and Terra Soft Solutions with Yellow Dog Linux.

When Apple dropped support for MkLinux, the developer community struggled to improve the Mach kernel, and to support various Power Macintosh models. MkLinux continued to be the only option for Macintosh NuBus computers until June 2000, when PPC/Linux for NuBus Power Macs was released.

Reception
MacTech magazine observed this of the general state of Linux on Macintosh in 1999: "Seen as a Windows NT or commercial Unix killer in some circles, Linux also promises to give the Mac OS a boost in the right direction and might even give Mac OS X Server a run for its money among Apple shops." The installation process was seen as "either smooth as silk or very, very rough" and that it "can also be slightly more difficult to recompile the MkLinux kernel because of the extra steps to placate the Mach microkernel." MkLinux had greater hardware compatibility than LinuxPPC at the time, supporting both NuBus and PCI Macintosh systems whereas LinuxPPC only supports PCI. Compared to LinuxPPC, MkLinux was generally known as having a performance cost due to the overhead of the Mach kernel. The Linux environment was found to provide a potentially adequate desktop suite, but one that forgoes the entire Macintosh experience in favor of pure Linux.

Legacy
MkLinux is the first official attempt by Apple to support a free and open-source software project. The work done with the Mach 3.0 kernel in MkLinux is said to have been extremely helpful in the initial porting of NeXTSTEP to the Macintosh hardware platform, which would later become macOS.

Releases

See also

 L4Linux
 Darwin (operating system)
 PureDarwin
 Copland (operating system)
 Taligent
 Workplace OS

References

External links

Apple Inc. operating systems
Discontinued Linux distributions
PowerPC operating systems
Microkernel-based operating systems
Mach (kernel)
Linux kernel variant
Microkernels
1996 software
Linux distributions